Ernest Edward Logan II (born May 18, 1968) and attended Pine Forest High School. The 6-foot-4, 290-pound Fayetteville, North Carolina native played his college football at East Carolina University from 1986 to 1990, where he racked up 100 tackles (including 16 behind the line of scrimmage) and 5.0 quarterback sacks. He played in the National Football League (NFL) from 1991–2000.

Post-playing career
Logan is currently a line coach at IMG Academy in Bradenton, Fla. after 11 years as the defensive line coach at Jacksonville University. He also did internships with the Cleveland Browns, New England Patriots and Miami Dolphins.

References

1968 births
Living people
People from Fort Bragg, North Carolina
American football defensive tackles
East Carolina Pirates football players
Cleveland Browns players
Atlanta Falcons players
Jacksonville Jaguars players
New York Jets players
Jacksonville Dolphins football coaches